Satyrodes is a genus of Satyrinae butterflies that is native to North America.

Species
Satyrodes eurydice (Linnaeus, 1763) – eyed brown or marsh eyed brown
Satyrodes appalachia (Chermock, 1947) – Appalachian brown or woods eyed brown

References

Elymniini
Butterfly genera
Taxa named by Samuel Hubbard Scudder